Sunken Worlds (German: Versunkene Welten) is a 1922 German silent film directed by Siegfried Philippi and starring Victor Varconi, Ria Jende and Hans Albers.

Cast
 Victor Varconi
 Ria Jende
 Max Devrient
 Hans Albers
 Henry Bender
 Ernst Dernburg
 Marie Grimm-Einödshofer
 Martha Hartmann
 Guido Herzfeld
 Rudolf Klein-Rhoden
 Marija Leiko
 Gustav May
 Loni Nest
 Hermann Picha
 Gaby Ungar

References

Bibliography
 Hans-Michael Bock and Tim Bergfelder. The Concise Cinegraph: An Encyclopedia of German Cinema. Berghahn Books, 2009.

External links

1922 films
Films of the Weimar Republic
Films directed by Siegfried Philippi
German silent feature films
German black-and-white films